Reece Mastin is the self-titled debut studio album by Reece Mastin, the 2011 winner of The X Factor (Australia), released through Sony Music Australia on 9 December 2011. The album debuted at number two on the ARIA Albums Chart and was certified double platinum by the Australian Recording Industry Association (ARIA). The album's lead single "Good Night", preceded the album's release, and debuted at number one on the ARIA Singles Chart. To promote the album, Mastin toured shopping centres across Australia. He also embarked on his first headlining Australian tour in December 2011 and ended in February 2012.

Background 
Reece Mastin features re-recorded studio tracks of some of Mastin's performances during the live shows on The X Factor (Australia), as well as his winner's single, "Good Night". Mastin recorded the album in three days. In an interview with News Limited, he explained: "We had to go as quick as I could, but it was a good three days ... Every song I tried to put in as much of me as I could. That's a good starting point, trying to be a little bit original on a covers album."

Release and promotion 
Reece Mastin was released by Sony Music Australia on 9 December 2011, as both digital download and CD formats. To launch the album, Mastin performed "Good Night" on Sunrise. During the week of the album's release (9 – 15 December), Mastin toured shopping malls in New South Wales, Western Australia, South Australia, Victoria and Queensland, performing several of the album's songs and signing CDs for fans. He also held an instore appearance at the Westfield Parramatta store in New South Wales on 22 December.

Singles
Following Mastin's win on the third series of The X Factor (Australia) on 22 November 2011, his winner's single "Good Night" was released for digital download, and served as the lead single from the album. The single received mixed to positive reviews from music critics, who noted its similarities to Pink's "Raise Your Glass" (2010). "Good Night" debuted at number one on the ARIA Singles Chart, where it remained for four non-consecutive weeks. It was certified five times platinum by the Australian Recording Industry Association (ARIA), for selling 350,000 copies.

Tour 
Mastin commenced his first headlining tour in Australia on 17 December 2011 and ended on 5 February 2012. Fellow X Factor contestants Johnny Ruffo and Christina Parie served as Mastin's supporting acts on the tour. The tour later extended in New Zealand during April 2012.

Commercial performance 
Reece Mastin debuted at number two on the ARIA Albums Chart on 19 December 2011. The album was certified double platinum by the Australian Recording Industry Association (ARIA), denoting shipments of 140,000 units. In New Zealand, the album debuted at number one on 27 February 2012 and was certified gold by the Recording Industry Association of New Zealand (RIANZ), denoting shipments of 7,500 copies.

Track listing

Charts and certifications

Weekly charts

Year-end charts

Decade-end charts

Certifications

References

2011 debut albums
Reece Mastin albums
Sony Music Australia albums
Albums produced by DNA Songs